Bieber is a surname of German and Ashkenazi Jewish origin. Notable people with the surname include:

Andy Bieber (1917–1985), Canadian footballer
Christopher Bieber (born 1989), German footballer
Clemens Bieber (born 1956), German operatic tenor
David Bieber (born 1966), American convicted murderer
Emilie Bieber (1810–1884) German photographer
Florian Bieber (born 1973), Austrian political scientist
Frederick Bieber (born 1950), American medical geneticist
Friedrich Bieber (1873–1924), Austrian anthropologist
Hailey Bieber (born 1996), American model and television personality and wife of Justin Bieber
Hanna Bieber-Böhm (1851-1910), German feminist and pioneer
Irving Bieber (1909–1971), American psychoanalyst
Jodi Bieber (born 1966), South African photographer
Justin Bieber (born 1994), Canadian singer
Kurt Bieber (1930–2015), American actor
Margarete Bieber (1879–1978), German American art historian
Martin Bieber (1900–1974), German World War II officer
Matthias Bieber (born 1986), Swiss ice hockey player
Nita Bieber (1926–2019), American actress
Owen Bieber (1929–2020), American trade union president
Shane Bieber (born 1995), American baseball player
Sigmar Bieber (born 1968), German footballer

See also
 Beber (disambiguation)
 Biber (surname)

German-language surnames
Germanic-language surnames
Surnames of German origin
Surnames from nicknames